The 1998 European Race Walking Cup was held in Dudince, Slovakia, on 25 April 1998.

Complete results were published.  Medal winners were published on the Athletics Weekly website,

Medallists

Results

Men's 20 km

Team (Men) 20 km

Men's 50 km

Team (Men) 50 km

Combined Team (Men)

Women's 10 km

Team (Women)

Participation
The participation of 208 athletes (145 men/63 women) from 28 countries is reported.

 (4)
 (12)
 (3)
 (8)
 (6)
 (7)
 (12)
 (11)
 (4)
 (12)
 (12)
 (6)
 (9)
 (1)
 (4)
 (7)
 (12)
 (12)
 (5)
 (12)
 (12)
 (12)
 (6)
 (1)
 (2)
 (12)
 (3)
 (1)

References

European Race Walking Cup
European Race Walking Cup
International athletics competitions hosted by Slovakia
European Race Walking Cup